Fingerhuthia is a genus of Asian and African plants in the grass family. Common names are thimble grass and Zulu fescue.

 Species
 Fingerhuthia africana Nees ex Lehm. - South Africa, Eswatini, Namibia, Angola, Zimbabwe, Mozambique, Saudi Arabia, Yemen, Oman, Pakistan, Afghanistan; naturalized in Pima County in Arizona in United States 
 Fingerhuthia sesleriiformis Nees - South Africa, Lesotho, Namibia

References

External links
 Plants photographed on Kyffhäuser photo from Namibia
 Sanbi Red List of South African Plants

Chloridoideae
Poaceae genera